Wilsons Promontory Lighthouse is situated on South East Point, Wilsons Promontory, Victoria, Australia. From its point on the peninsula, it commands almost 360° views of Bass Strait. Dormitory-style accommodation is available in the lighthouse.

The lighthouse protects shipping travelling through Bass Strait. The Wilsons Promontory Lighthouse is the main part of the Wilsons Promontory Lightstation.

History
The lighthouse was constructed with the use of convict labour over a period of approximately seven years starting in 1853 through to completion in 1859. From 1869 to 1878 the lighthouse keeper was Captain Thomas Musgrave.

See also

 List of lighthouses in Australia

References

External links

 Parks Victoria: Wilsons Promontory Lighthouse 
 

Bass Strait
Wilsons Promontory
Lighthouses in Victoria (Australia)
Lighthouses completed in 1859
1859 establishments in Australia
Commonwealth Heritage List places in Victoria
Victorian Heritage Register
Shire of South Gippsland